The Subprefecture of Jaçanã-Tremembé is one of 32 subprefectures of the city of São Paulo, Brazil.  It comprises two districts: Jaçanã and Tremembé. It's the northernmost subprefecture and largely covered by parts of the Atlantic Forest.

References

Subprefectures of São Paulo